Gilbert Christian Schools is a system of private Christian schools in Gilbert, Arizona, United States. It includes 2 Kindergarten through Middle School campuses, as well as a high school campus all at separate physical locations. The high school was founded in 2003. The Greenfield campus opened in August 2017 with over 300 students the first day.

History
The first school opened as Surrey Garden Christian School in 1996 with 14 students; it moved in 2002 to a new facility in Gilbert's Agritopia neighborhood.. The next year, the school joined the Arizona Interscholastic Association for high school athletics; with just 50 high school students, it was the association's smallest full member school. After adding seven classrooms to the Agritopia campus to expand the high school in 2007, Surrey Garden changed its name to Gilbert Christian in 2009, after it parted ways with founder Tim Ihms, and was approved to build a separate high school campus to house up to 420 students.

In 2017, Gilbert Christian opened a third campus to house up to 540 K–8 students, alongside the Agritopia site.

References

Private high schools in Arizona
Private elementary schools in Arizona
Private middle schools in Arizona
Christian schools in Arizona